This is a list of notable painters from, or associated with, Sweden .

A 
 Carl Gabriel Adelsköld (1830–1914)
Ulla Adlerfelt (1736–1765)
Sofia Adlersparre (1808–1862)
Ivan Aguéli (1869–1917)
Sofia Ahlbom (1823–1868)
Lea Ahlborn (1829–1891)
Modhir Ahmed (born 1956)
Margareta Alströmer (1763–1816) 
 Hjördis Piuva Andersson (born 1933)
Tage Åsén (born 1943)

B 
Eva Bagge (1871–1964)
John Bauer (1882–1918)
Richard Bergh (1858–1919)
Alfred Bergström (1869-1930)
Anna Billing (1849–1927)
Torsten Billman (1909–1989)
Hugo Birger (1854–1887)
Oscar Björck (1860–1929)
Eva Bonnier (1857–1909)
Carl Oscar Borg (1879–1947)
Carl Fredrik von Breda (1759–1818)

C 
John Fabian Carlson (1875–1945)
Otto Gustaf Carlsund (1897–1948)
Maria Carowsky (1723–1793)
Charlotta Cedercreutz (1736–1815)
Siv Cedering (1939–2007)
Christina Charlotta Cederström (1760–1832)
Gustaf Cederström (1845–1933)
Emma Chadwick (1855–1932)

D 
Michael Dahl (1659–1743)
Peter Dahl (1934–2019)
Nils Dardel (1888–1943)
Siri Derkert (1888–1973)

E 
Anna Maria Ehrenstrahl (1666–1729)
Marianne Ehrenström (1773–1867)
Benny Ekman (born 1955) 
Marie-Louise Ekman (born 1944)
Emma Ekwall (1838–1925)
Knut Ekwall (1843–1912) 
Ester Ellqvist (1880–1918)
Albert Engström (1869–1940)
Sven Erixson (1899–1970)

F 
Öyvind Fahlström (1928–1976)
Gustaf Fjæstad (1868–1948) 
Victor Forssell (1846–1931)
John Erik Franzén (born 1942)
David Frumerie (1641–1677)

G 
Carl Johan De Geer (born 1938)
Wilhelm von Gegerfelt (1844–1920)
Felix Gmelin (born 1963)
Isaac Hirsche Grünewald (1889–1946)
Maria Johanna Görtz (1783–1853)

H 
Axel Haig (1835–1921)
Amalia von Helvig (1776–1831)
Olof Hermelin (1827–1913)
Otto Hesselbom (1848–1913)
Anna Maria Hilfeling (1713–1783)
Carl Fredrik Hill (1849–1911)
Hanna Hirsch-Pauli (1864–1940)
Sigrid Hjertén (1885–1948)
Bror Hjorth (1894–1968)
Olle Hjortzberg (1872–1959)
Johan Fredrik Höckert (1826–1866)
Tora Vega Holmström (1880–1967)

I 
Sven Inge (1935–2008)
Arne Isacsson (1917–2010)
Karl Isakson (1878–1922)
Helena Sophia Isberg (1819–1875)

J 
Eugène Jansson (1862–1915)
August Jernberg (1826–1896)
Einar Jolin (1890–1976)
Arvid Jorm (1892–1964)
Ernst Josephson (1851–1906)
Daniel Jouseff (born 1975)

K 
Hilma af Klint (1862–1944)
Per Krafft the Elder (1724–1793)
Per Krafft the Younger (1777–1863)
Wilhelmina Krafft (1778–1828)
Nils Kreuger (1858–1930)
Julius Kronberg (1850–1921)
Hans Krondahl (1929–2018)
Johan Krouthén (1859–1932)

L 
Niclas Lafrensen (1737–1807)
 Olle Langert (1924–2016)
Carl Larsson (1859–1928)
Bruno Liljefors (1860–1939)
Amalia Lindegren (1814–1891)
 Arvid Mauritz Lindström (1849–1923)
Bengt Lindström (1925–2008)
Louise Lidströmer (born 1948)
Sven Ljungberg (1913–2010)
Jonas Lundh (born 1965)
Evert Lundquist (1904–1994)
Torsten Löwgren (1903–1991)

M 
Elias Martin (1739–1818)
Anna Munthe-Norstedt (1854–1936)

N 
 Rolf Nerlöv (1940–2015)
Einar Nerman (1888–1983)
Bengt Nordenberg (1822–1902)
Anna Nordlander (1843–1879)
Jockum Nordström (born 1963)
Karl Nordström (1855–1923)
Max Magnus Norman (born 1973)

O 
 Allan Österlind (1855–1938)
 John Österlund (1875–1953)
 Bernhard Österman (1870–1938)
 Emil Österman (1870–1927) 
 Barbro Östlihn (1930–1995)

P 
Anna Palm de Rosa (1859–1924)
Gustaf Wilhelm Palm (1810–1890)
Ulrika Pasch (1735–1796)
Georg Pauli (1855–1935)
Axel Petersson Döderhultarn (1868–1925)
Albertus Pictor (c.1440–1509)
Carl Gustaf Pilo (1711–1793)

R 
Carl Fredrik Reuterswärd (1934–2016)
Lennart Rodhe (1916–2005)
Maria Rohl (1801–1875)
Georg von Rosen (1843–1923)
Alexander Roslin (1718–1798)
Gustaf Rydberg (1835–1933)

S 
Hugo Salmson (1843–1894)
Birger Sandzén (1871–1954)
Bertram Schmiterlöw (1920–2002)
Josabeth Sjöberg (1812–1882)
Monica Sjöö (1938–2005)
Carl Skånberg (1850–1883)
Sigrid Snoilsky (1813–1856)
Louis Sparre (1863–1964)
Joseph Magnus Stäck (1812–1868)
August Strindberg (1849–1912)
Harriet Sundström (1872–1961)
Max Walter Svanberg (1912–1994)
Roland Svensson (1910–2003)
Johan Sylvius (1620–1695)

T 
Anna Maria Thelott (1683–1710)
Axel Törneman (1880–1925)
Carl Trägårdh (1861–1899)

U 
Urban målare (16th century)

W 
David Wallin (1876–1957)
Alfred Wahlberg (1834–1906)  
Peter Weiss (1916–1982)
Adolf Ulrik Wertmüller (1751–1811)
Fredric Westin (1782–1862)
Jan Widströmer (born 1944)
 Arne Wiig (born 1964)
Richard Winkler (born 1969)

Z 
Olle Zetterquist (born 1927)
Kristoffer Zetterstrand (born 1973)
Anders Zorn (1860–1920)

See also
 List of Swedish artists

Swedish painters
Swedish
Painters